Movies is the second album by Holger Czukay, released in 1979 through Electrola.

Accolades

Track listing

Personnel 
Rebop Kwaku Baah – organ on "Cool in the Pool"
Holger Czukay – vocals, guitar, bass guitar, keyboards, synthesizer, production, engineering, mixing, recording
Jaki Liebezeit – drums, congas
Michael Karoli – guitar on "Oh Lord, Give Us More Money"
Irmin Schmidt – grand piano on "Oh Lord, Give Us More Money"

References 

1979 albums
Harvest Records albums
Holger Czukay albums
EMI Records albums